Abu Ballas (the pottery hill) is an archaeological site in the Libyan Desert of Egypt. Both hills are covered with Egyptian pottery. These vessels were at the beginning of the 20th century often well preserved, but are today - due to modern tourism - very much destroyed. The site was discovered in 1918 and 1923. More recent research was undertaken in the last years.

The area is name giver for the geological Abu Ballas formation.

Neolithic Occupation
Scholars suggest, that the Abu Ballas area has been occupied from about 8700 BP to about 5700 BP. They blame environmental conditions for a sudden cessation of human occupation there.

The Abu Ballas Trail
The nature of this site remained for a long time mysteries. More recent research has shown that the site was a station on an ancient desert road, called Abu Ballas Trail, that connected the Dakla Oasis with the Gilf Kebir and the Jebel Ouenat. Some researchers maintain that Abu Ballas was a milestone of an ancient Egyptian trade route into central Africa or for prospecting minerals The place was installed in the late Old Kingdom or early First Intermediate Period, when some authorities decided to arrange supply depots on a track in the desert. Abu Ballas was one of the largest. Besides the pottery there were discovered some rock carvings, stone tools and even a senet game board engraved on a stone. There are no water sources nearby, evidently all water and food was brought here from the Dakhla Oases with donkeys. Most likely people lived here only for short periods of time. The desert road was mainly in use at the end of the Old Kingdom and to a lesser extent in the Second Intermediate Period and in the New Kingdom.

References 

Populated places established in the 9th millennium BC
Populated places disestablished in the 6th millennium BC
1918 archaeological discoveries
Saharan rock art
New Valley Governorate
Caves of Egypt
Archaeological sites in Egypt
Neolithic sites